Saturday Teenage Kick is the first studio album by the Dutch electronic musician Junkie XL, released in 1997.

This album features vocal work by Patrick 'Rude Boy' Tilon from the Dutch group Urban Dance Squad.

Some of the album tracks (Dealing with the Roster, War, No Remorse, X-Panding Limits, Def Beat, Mulu, Underachievers, and a live version of Fight) were added to the hoax The Prodigy album The Castbreeder in 1998 under different names.

Track listing
 "Underachievers" – 5:32
 "Billy Club" – 4:08
 "No Remorse" – 6:40
 "Metrolike" – 5:37
 "X-Panding Limits" – 3:17
 "War" – 2:49
 "Saturday Teenage Kick" – 4:15
 "Dealing with the Roster" – 5:27
 "Fight" – 5:38
 "Melange" – 4:07
 "Def Beat" – 4:54
 "Future in Computer Hell" – 17:51
 "Mulu" (hidden track) – starts 8:03 into the above track (only on the Netherlands, Poland, Australia and digital releases, other releases end where Mulu starts)

Personnel 
 Tom Holkenborg – producer, writer, engineering, mixing, programming, keyboards, bass, guitars
 Silver Surfering Rudeboy – vocals, songwriting
 Rene van der Zee - guitars
 Dino Cazares - guitars
 Baz Mattie – drums
 Hay Zeelen - mastering
 Lucas van Slegtenhorst - A&R

References

Junkie XL albums
1997 debut albums
Roadrunner Records albums